Griseargiolestes griseus is a species of Australian damselfly in the family Megapodagrionidae,
commonly known as a grey flatwing. 
It is endemic to south-eastern New South Wales, where it inhabits bogs and seepages near small streams.

Griseargiolestes griseus is a medium-sized damselfly, black-green metallic in colour with pale markings. Adults can be strongly pruinescent on their body and tail.
Like other members of the family Megapodagrionidae, it rests with its wings outspread.

Gallery

See also
 List of Odonata species of Australia

References 

Megapodagrionidae
Odonata of Australia
Insects of Australia
Endemic fauna of Australia
Taxa named by Hermann August Hagen
Insects described in 1862
Damselflies